Uragyad'n of the Seven Pillars is a 1981 role-playing game adventure for Traveller published by FASA.

Plot summary
Uragyad'n of the Seven Pillars is adventure set on the planet Vahjdi in the Far Frontiers sector, on a tidal-locked planet with a small habitable stretch of desert land, and the adventure centers on the attempts of a small group of hired mercenaries to lead the planet's low-tech native tribes in a rebellion against the higher-tech invaders from a nearby world.

Publication history
Uragyad'n of the Seven Pillars was written by J. Andrew Keith and William H. Keith Jr., and was published in 1982 by FASA as a digest-sized 48-page book with a two-color map.

Reception
William A. Barton reviewed Uragyad'n of the Seven Pillars in The Space Gamer No. 49. Barton commented that "Overall, Uragyad'n of the Seven Pillars is an excellent offering that should provide hours of entertainment and adventure to Traveller players. I recommend it highly."

Bob McWilliams reviewed Uragyad'n of the Seven Pillars for White Dwarf #31, giving it an overall rating of 8 out of 10, and stated that "Well produced and with plenty going on, the designers have provided referees with as much help as can be fitted in booklets of this size, gone into detail at points in the adventure where it's necessary and not filled out with 'chrome'."

Reviews
 Different Worlds #22 (July, 1982)

References

Role-playing game supplements introduced in 1981
Traveller (role-playing game) adventures